Thierry Espié (born 2 February 1952) is a French former professional motorcycle racer. He competed in Grand Prix motorcycle road racing from 1977 to 1985.

Espié was born in Vanves, France. His best years were in 1979 when he finished in fourth place in the 125cc world championship and in 1980 when he finished in fourth place in the 250cc world championship.

References

1952 births
Living people
Sportspeople from Boulogne-Billancourt
French motorcycle racers
125cc World Championship riders
250cc World Championship riders
350cc World Championship riders
500cc World Championship riders